Ska-Core, the Devil, and More is an EP by The Mighty Mighty Bosstones.  It was first released in 1993 by Mercury Records. This EP includes one ska and three hardcore covers.

Track listing
"Someday I Suppose" (Dicky Barrett, Nate Albert, Joe Gittleman) – 3:26
"Think Again" (Minor Threat) – 1:56
"Lights Out" (Angry Samoans) – 0:49
"Police Beat" (SSD) – 2:09
"Simmer Down"  (Bob Marley) – 3:34
"Drugs and Kittens"/"I'll Drink to That" (Live) (Barrett, Gittleman) – 6:17
"Howwhywuz Howwhyam" (Live) (Barrett, Gittleman) – 2:26 [Bonus Track]

Personnel
Dicky Barrett – lead vocals
Nate Albert – guitar, backing vocals
Joe Gittleman – bass, backing vocals
Joe Sirois – drums
Tim Burton – saxophone
Kevin Lenear – saxophone
Dennis Brockenborough – trombone
Ben Carr – Bosstone, backing vocals
Fred Bortolotti – assistant engineer
Phil Greene – engineer
Ross Humphrey – engineer
Cindy Bortman – photography
Bob Paré - Front Cover Photo

Notes
 At the end of the last track, at the 36 minute and 17 second mark (until the end of the disc), is a hidden track featuring a live performance of "Howwhywuz, Howwhyam", a song from an earlier Bosstones album Devil's Night Out.
 "Drugs and Kittens" is a live version of "Drunks and Children" from Devil's Night Out
 "Think Again" originally by Minor Threat, "Lights Out" by Angry Samoans, "Police Beat" by SSD, "Simmer Down" by The Wailers
The front cover photo was taken by Lowell, MA Photographer, Bob Paré. The background is one of his dad's flannel shirts that Bob wore to many Bosstones' shows while photographing them.

References

1993 EPs
Mercury Records EPs
The Mighty Mighty Bosstones EPs